Raimo Hirvonen (born 17 January 1950) is a Finnish former wrestler who competed in the 1972 Summer Olympics.

References

External links
 

1950 births
Living people
Olympic wrestlers of Finland
Wrestlers at the 1972 Summer Olympics
Finnish male sport wrestlers